SS Giulio Cesare was initially a liner of the Navigazione Generale Italiana, which was later operated by the Italian Line. The ship was used to transport first class, second class, and tourist-class passengers.

Features

A feature of this ship was the Club situated on the boat-deck, with a bar. The ship also featured a saloon dining room, galleries, a ballroom, and other function rooms. Second class was situated amidships. Talkie apparatus were also fitted to the ship and a long-distance wireless telephone was also available. The tourist class accommodation was situated astern and also had several public rooms. The tourist passengers shared an open-air swimming pool with the 2nd class passengers.

Service history

The ship was used on Genoa-Naples-South America voyages but also served North American ports. Until 1925 the SS Giulio Cesare and the SS Duilio were the two largest ships in the Italian merchant fleet.

In November 1933, she was reconditioned and made ready to serve on the Mediterranean-South Africa Service. In 1935, she collided with the German steamship Barenfels in the harbour of Gibraltar. This collision was deemed to be the fault of the German steamship and the captain and crew were detained along with the ship.

In 1942, during the Second World War, SS Giulio Cesare was chartered to the International Red Cross for a time before being laid-up in the port of Trieste. SS Giulio Cesare was sunk by SAAF Beaufighters from No. 16 Squadron on 28 August 1944. Upon returning from their mission, the airmen who sank the ship were reprimanded as their commanders believed that they had sunk a hospital ship.

Gallery

References

External links 
Grace's Guide – Swan Hunter 1920

Passenger ships of Italy
Steamships
Ocean liners
1920 ships
Maritime incidents in 1935
Merchant ships sunk by aircraft
Maritime incidents in July 1944
Cultural depictions of Julius Caesar
Ships sunk by South African aircraft